The efferent vessels of the tracheobronchial lymph nodes ascend upon the trachea and unite with efferents of the internal mammary and anterior mediastinal glands to form the right and left bronchomediastinal trunks.

The right bronchomediastinal trunk may join the right lymphatic duct, and the left thoracic duct. More frequently, they open independently of these ducts into the junction of the internal jugular and subclavian veins of their own side.

References

External links
 https://web.archive.org/web/20071113205446/http://www.instantanatomy.net/thorax/vessels/lrightlymphatictrunk.html

Lymphatics of the torso